Setyabudi is an Indonesian surname that may refer to 
Ernest Douwes Dekker (Danudirja Setyabudi, 1879–1950), Indonesian-Dutch freedom fighter,  nationalist and politician of Indo descent.
Agung Setyabudi (born 1972), Indonesian footballer.

Setiabudi (a place) in Indonesia that may refer to 
 Setiabudi is a subdistrict in South Jakarta, capital city of Indonesia.